Kim Shuck is a Tsalagi (Cherokee)/Euro-American   poet, author, weaver, and bead work artist who draws from Southeastern Native American culture and tradition as well as contemporary urban Indian life. She was born in San Francisco, California and belongs to the northern California Cherokee diaspora. She is a member of the Cherokee Nation of Oklahoma. She earned a B.A. in art (1994), and M.F.A. in Textiles (1998) from San Francisco State University. Her basket weaving work is influenced by her grandmother Etta Mae Rowe and the long history of California Native American basket making.

She has taught American Indian Studies at San Francisco State University and was an artist in residence at the de Young Museum in June 2010 with Michael Horse.

On June 21, 2017, Mayor Ed Lee named Shuck as the 7th poet laureate of San Francisco.

Awards 
 2022 COSTO Medal from University of California Riverside
 2019 National Laureate Fellowship from the Academy of American Poets 
 2019 PEN Oakland Censorship Award
 2008 KQED Local Hero Award, American Indian Heritage Month
 2007 Smuggling Cherokee, Poetry Foundation bestseller list (March)
 2006 Smuggling Cherokee, SPD Books bestseller list (March)
 2005 Mentor of the Year Award Wordcraft Circle of Native Writers and Storytellers
 2005 Native Writers of the Americas First Book, Diane Decorah Award 
 2004 Mary Tallmountain Award

Bibliography 
Author:
2021 Exile Heart, That Painted Horse Press
2019 Deer Trails: San Francisco Poet Laureate Series No. 7, City Lights Publishers
 2014  Sidewalk Ndn, solo chapbook of poetry, FootHills Publishing
 2014  Clouds Running In, solo book of poetry, Taurean Horn Press 
 2013  Rabbit Stories, vignette fiction, Poetic Matrix Press 
 2005  Smuggling Cherokee, solo volume of poems, Greenfield Review Press 

Editor:
 2010 "Rabbit and Rose", online journal, editor, online publication (http://www.rabbitandrose.com/)
 2007 Oakland Out Loud, (Ed.) anthology, co-editor, Jukebox Press 
 2006 Words Upon the Waters, (Ed.) anthology, assistant editor, Jukebox Press 2006

References

When Words Matter: An Interview with Kim Shuck (1-12-2015) An Interview with Kim Shuck and Marcer Campbell
Contributor: River, Blood and Corn ... ed. Terra Trevor ... river blood and corn blog

Cherokee Nation artists
American women poets
21st-century American poets
Poets from California
Native American poets
Year of birth missing (living people)
Living people
San Francisco State University alumni
21st-century American women writers
Poets Laureate of San Francisco
21st-century Native Americans
21st-century Native American women